Ompton is a village in Nottinghamshire, England, three miles south-east of Ollerton. It is in the civil parish of Ompton, but for census purposes its population count is included together with the civil parishes of Laxton and Moorhouse, and Ossington..Kneesall lies to the southwest, and Wellow to the north west .  It has a red-brick chapel of 1860. About half a mile to the west is a water pumping station, built 1965–68 as a tiled pyramid on a glazed plinth.

References

External links

Villages in Nottinghamshire
Newark and Sherwood